In enzymology, a glutamate synthase (NADPH) is an enzyme that catalyzes the chemical reaction

L-glutamine + 2-oxoglutarate + NADPH + H+  2 L-glutamate + NADP+

Thus, the four substrates of this enzyme are L-glutamine, 2-oxoglutarate (α-ketoglutarate), NADPH, and H+, whereas the two products are L-glutamate and NADP+.

This enzyme belongs to the family of oxidoreductases, specifically those acting on the CH-NH2 group of donors with NAD+ or NADP+ as acceptor.   This enzyme participates in glutamate metabolism and nitrogen metabolism.  It has 5 cofactors: FAD, Iron, FMN, Sulfur,  and Iron-sulfur.

It occurs in bacteria and plants but not animals, and is important as it provides glutamate for the glutamine synthetase reaction.

Nomenclature 

The systematic name of this enzyme class is L-glutamate:NADP+ oxidoreductase (transaminating). Other names in common use include:

 glutamate (reduced nicotinamide adenine dinucleotide phosphate), synthase,
 glutamate synthase (NADPH),
 glutamate synthetase (NADP),
 glutamine amide-2-oxoglutarate aminotransferase (oxidoreductase, NADP),
 glutamine-ketoglutaric aminotransferase,
 L-glutamate synthase,
 L-glutamate synthetase,
 L-glutamine:2-oxoglutarate aminotransferase, NADPH oxidizing,
 NADPH-dependent glutamate synthase,
 NADPH-glutamate synthase, and
 NADPH-linked glutamate synthase.

Structural studies 

As of late 2007, only one structure has been solved for this class of enzymes, with the PDB accession code .

See also

Glutamate synthase (NADH)
Glutamate synthase (ferredoxin)

References

Further reading 

 
 

EC 1.4.1
NADPH-dependent enzymes
Flavoproteins
Iron enzymes
Sulfur enzymes
Iron-sulfur enzymes
Enzymes of known structure